The Commons Act 1285 (13 Edw 1 c 46) was an Act of the Parliament of England. It was chapter 46 of the Statute of Westminster the Second.

It was repealed for Ireland by section 1 of, and the Schedule to, the Statute Law (Ireland) Revision Act 1872.

The whole Chapter, so far as unrepealed, in so far as it extended to Northern Ireland, was repealed by section 1 of, and Schedule 1 to, the Statute Law Revision Act 1950.

So much of this statute as ordained that the towns near adjoining were to be distrained to levy, at their own cost, a hedge or dyke overthrown, and to yield damages, was repealed, as to England, by the 7 & 8 Geo 4 c 27. It was repealed to the same extent, on 1 March 1829, as to all persons, matters and things over whom or which the jurisdiction of any of the King's courts of justice erected within the British Dominions under the government of the United Company of Merchants of England trading to the East Indies extended by section 125 of the Criminal Law (India) Act 1828 (9 Geo 4 c 74).

The whole Act was repealed for England and Wales by section 47(1) of, and Part 3 of Schedule 6 to, the Commons Act 2006.

See also
Commons Act

References
Halsbury's Statutes,

External links
The Commons Act 1285, as amended from the National Archives.

Acts of the Parliament of England
1280s in law
1285 in England
Common land in England